Buckley is a surname originating from either Ireland or England where it is particularly common, as well as Canada and the United States.

Some sources outline an Irish origin, whereas others outline an Old English origin.

Spelling variations of Buckley include Bucklie, Buckly, Bulkley, Buhilly, Ó Buachalla, Boughla and others.

Origins 
The English surname is credited by some unknown sources as being of Old English origin, either as a habitation surname derived from settlements named Buckley, or as an occupational surname from the Anglo-Saxon words Bucc and Leah, meaning goat and wood.

A branch of the Buckley family lived in Buckley, Greater Manchester, in Rochdale for many centuries. They gave their name to Buckley Hall, a manor house found within the locality. Their name is said to derive from "bleak hill" and they can be traced back to a "Geoffrey de Buckley".

In Ireland, Ó Buachalla, taken from the Irish word 'buachaill' originally meaning 'herdsman' (in modern Irish it has come to mean 'boy'), was anglicised early as Ó Boughelly, Boughla, Buhilly and later as Buckley.

Notable Buckleys
 A. J. Buckley (born 1978), American actor
 Abel Buckley (1835–1908), British manufacturer 
 Alan Buckley (born 1951), British football manager
 Albert Buckley (1877–1965), British Conservative politician
 Alexander Buckley (1891–1918), Australian Victoria Cross recipient
 Andrew Buckley (field hockey) (born 1973), New Zealand field hockey player
 Ann Buckley, Irish musicologist
 Anna Buckley (1924–2003), American politician
 Anthony Buckley (born 1937), Australian film editor and producer
 Arthur Buckley (1891–1974), Australian politician
 Austin Buckley (born 1960), Irish hurler
 Barbara Buckley (born 1960), American attorney and Democratic Party politician
 Barry Buckley (1938–2006)
 Ben Buckley (born 1967), Australian businessman and footballer
 Betty Buckley (born 1947), American actress
 Brad Buckley (born 1952), Australian artist
 Brandon Buckley (born 2000), English professional footballer
 Brian Buckley (footballer, born 1935) (1935–2014), Australian rules footballer who played for Carlton
 Brian Buckley (political advisor) (1935–2013), Australian rules footballer who played for Footscray
 Bridget Buckley (born 1955), British rower
 Bryan Buckley (born 1963), American film and commercial director and screenwriter
 Caleb F. Buckley (1841–1879), American politician
 Carol Buckley (born 1954), American elephant caregiver
 Cecil Buckley (1830–1872), Royal Navy officer, Victoria Cross recipient
 Charles Buckley (disambiguation), several people
 Cheryl Buckley (born 1956), British design historian
 Christine Buckley (1940s–2014), Irish activist
 Christopher Augustine Buckley (1845–1922), "Blind Boss" Buckley, 19th century political boss in San Francisco, California
 Christopher Buckley (novelist) (born 1952), American author, son of William F. Buckley Jr.
 Connie Buckley (1915–2009), Irish hurler
 Curtis Buckley (born 1970), football cornerback
 Dan Buckley, American comic books executive
 Daniel Buckley (1890–1918), one of the survivors of the sinking of the RMS Titanic
 David Buckley (born 1976), British composer of film and television scores
 David Joss Buckley (born 1948), British screenwriter, playwright, author, actor, and musician
 Delron Buckley (born 1977), South African footballer
 Denis Buckley (born 1990), rugby union player from Ireland
 Dennis J. Buckley Jr. (1920–1943), United States Navy sailor and Silver Star recipient
 Dick Buckley (1925–2010), American radio presenter
 Dick Buckley (baseball) (1858–1929), American baseball player (MLB)
 Din Joe Buckley (1919–2009), member of the Cork Hurling 4 in row team 1941–1944
 Donie Buckley, Irish Gaelic footballer and coach
 Dylan Buckley (born 1993), footballer
 Ed Buckley (1889–1932), footballer
 Edward Pery Buckley (1796–1873), British Liberal and Whig politician
 Edmund Buckley (disambiguation), several people
 Eldra Buckley (born 1985), American football player
 Ellen Buckley (1909–2009), American military nurse
 Elsie Finnimore Buckley (1882–1959), English writer and translator
 Emerson Buckley (1916–1989), American conductor
 Eric Buckley (1868–1948), English clergyman
 Esther Buckley (1948–2013), American educator
 Ginny Buckley (born 1970), British television presenter
 Graham Buckley (born 1963), Scottish footballer
 James Buckley, several people
 Jean Buckley (born 1931), All-American Girls Professional Baseball League player
 Jeff Buckley (1966–1997), American songwriter, son of Tim Buckley
 Jenny Buckley (born 1979), Irish television presenter
 Jessie Buckley (born 1989), Irish actress
 Jimmy Buckley (died 1943), British World War II pilot and POW
 John Buckley (disambiguation), several people
 Jorunn Jacobsen Buckley (born 1944), Norwegian-American professor
 Keith Buckley (born 1979), vocalist for Every Time I Die
 Kevin Buckley (born 1959), American baseball player (MLB)
 Laura Buckley (1977–2022), Irish artist
 Leila Buckley (1917–2013), English poet, writer and translator
 Lord Buckley (Richard Myrle Buckley, 1906–1960), American monologist
 Matthew Buckley, British actor
 Maurice Buckley (1891–1921), Australian Victoria Cross recipient
 Melanie Buckley (born 1982), English chess master
 Mick Buckley (1953–2013), English footballer
 Mortimer J. Buckley (born 1969), American financial executive
 Nathan Buckley (born 1972), Australian rules footballer
 Patricia Buckley (1926–2007), American socialite, wife of William F. Buckley Jr.
 Raymond Buckley (born 1959), American politician from New Hampshire
 Rebecca Buckley (born 1933), American pediatrician and medical educator
 Roger Buckley (1937–2020), American historian, novelist, and Asian Americanist
 Samuel Botsford Buckley (1809–1884), American botanist and naturalist
 Shane Buckley (born 1992), Irish rugby player
 Sigebert Buckley (1520–1610), only monk of Westminster to survive the Reformation
 Stephen Buckley (born 1959), Australian rules footballer
 Steve Buckley (journalist) (born 1956), American sports journalist
 Terrell Buckley (born 1971), American football player and coach
 Thomas H. Buckley (1897–1960), American politician who served as Massachusetts Auditor
 Thomas J. Buckley (1895–1964), American politician who served as Massachusetts Auditor
 Thomas Buckley (1942–2015), American anthropologist and Buddhist monastic
 Tim Buckley (1947–1975), American songwriter
 Troy Buckley (born 1968), American college baseball coach
 Vincent Buckley (1925–1988), Australian poet, teacher, editor, essayist, and critic
 Walter Buckley (footballer) (1906–1985), English footballer
 Walter F. Buckley (1922–2006), American sociologist
 William Buckley (convict) (1776–1856), Australian convict
 William F. Buckley Jr. (1925–2008), American writer and conservative leader
 William Francis Buckley (1928–1985), CIA employee captured by Hezbollah

See also
 List of Old English (Anglo-Saxon) surnames
 Buckley (disambiguation)
 Buckby (surname)
 Buckbee

References

Surnames
English-language surnames
Surnames of Old English origin
Surnames of Irish origin
Anglicised Irish-language surnames
Surnames of English origin
Surnames of British Isles origin

ru:Бакли
sl:Buckley